Herochroma usneata is a moth of the family Geometridae first described by Felder and Rogenhofer in 1875. It is found in northern India.

References

Moths described in 1875
Pseudoterpnini
Moths of Asia